American Hardcore: A Tribal History is a book written by Steven Blush that relates the history of the hardcore punk movement that took place in Northern America between 1980 and 1986. It was first published by Feral House in October 2001.

The book was the basis of the documentary film American Hardcore (2006), directed by Paul Rachman.

Cover art
The book cover features a colorized version by Eric Hammer of a black-and-white photograph, taken by Edward Colver, portraying Danny Spira, lead singer of Los Angeles hardcore punk band Wasted Youth, performing in 1981 at Godzilla's, a former bowling alley, nightclub, and music venue in Sun Valley, California.

Second edition (2010)
Feral House released an extended second edition on November 1, 2010. In this practically new book, the author updated all of the chapters, added a new one titled "Destroy Babylon", which explores the mutant forms of spirituality that came from the movement, and interviewed over twenty-five new subjects.  Blush also has unearthed over a hundred new pieces of artwork, drafted two hundred plus new band bios, and radically expanded discography.  Most significant, he has offered a new conclusion which is an anomaly within the realm of period studies. The original book was 328 pages, and the revised edition 408.

Notes

References

Further reading
 Blush, Steven (2001). American Hardcore: A Tribal History. Feral House. .
 Blush, Steven (2001). American Hardcore: A Tribal History. Second ed., 2010. Feral House. .

External links
 American Hardcore: A Tribal History, official website. American Hardcore Book.

Reviews
 Cooper, Carol (October 20, 2010). "American Hardcore: Second Edition - Stage-Dives Back into the Seminal Music Scene". The Village Voice.
 Barbrick, Greg (October 16, 2010). "Book Review: American Hardcore: A Tribal History (Second Edition) by Steven Blush". Blogcritics.
 Barbrick, Greg (April 26, 2011). "Book Review: American Hardcore: A Tribal History (Second Edition) by Steven Blush". Seattlepi.

Excerpts
 American Hardcore: A Tribal History: "Foreword". Feral House.
 American Hardcore: A Tribal History: "America's Hardcore". Feral House.
 American Hardcore: A Tribal History: "How Much Art Can You Take?". Feral House.
 Berfrois (November 4, 2010). "Excerpt: 'American Hardcore: A Tribal History' by Steven Blush". Berfrois.

2001 non-fiction books
History books about the United States
Hardcore punk
Books about rock music
Non-fiction books adapted into films
Feral House books